György Sebők (November 2, 1922 – November 14, 1999) was a Hungarian-born American pianist and professor at the Indiana University's Jacobs School of Music in Bloomington, Indiana, United States.

He was known worldwide as a soloist with major orchestras, a recitalist on four continents, a recording artist, and for his master classes, visiting professorships, and the Swiss music festival he organized in Ernen.

Biography 

He was born in Szeged, Hungary on November 2, 1922.

Sebők gave his first solo piano recital at age 11. At 14, he played Beethoven's Piano Concerto No. 1 under conductor Ferenc Fricsay—a performance upon which he would reflect many years later.

He enrolled in the Franz Liszt Academy at the age of 16, under the guidance of Zoltán Kodály and Leo Weiner. After graduating, he gave concerts for ten years throughout Eastern and Central Europe and the former Soviet Union.

He won the Grand Prix du Disque in 1957. Sebők was listed in Who's Who in America, Who's Who in Music, the National Register of Prominent Americans, and other biographical dictionaries. He received numerous honors, including the Cross of Merit of the Hungarian Government, La Medaille de la Ville de Paris, Echelon Vermeille, and, in 1996, Kulturpreis des Staates Wallis, (Prix de Consecration). Also in 1996, the French Government bestowed on him the decoration Chevalier de L'Ordre des Arts et des Lettres.

Teaching 

In 1949, he was named professor of music at the Béla Bartók Conservatory in Budapest. After the Hungarian revolt of 1956, he settled in Paris.  Encouraged by his cellist friend János Starker, at the age of forty, he went to Indiana University School of Music in Bloomington, starting what is considered to be the most productive phase of his career. Jeremy Denk dedicated his memoir "Every Good Boy Does Fine: A Love Story in Music Lessons" to Sebők, and wrote about the profound impact that Sebők had upon his musical upbringing and career.

Sebők was a guest professor of the Berlin Hochschule der Kunste (HDK) in Germany, there teaching master classes twice a year. He was also an honorary life member of Tokyo's Toho School of Music, and a regular guest teacher at the Banff Centre for Arts; the Amsterdam Sweelinck Conservatorium, the School of Music in Barcelona, and the Hochschule für Musik in Stuttgart. In 1974 he founded and organized annual summer master classes in Ernen, Switzerland for pianists and 'other instruments', and the following year he was a member the jury for the first Paloma O'Shea Santander International Piano Competition. He also founded and directed the "Festival der Zukunft" in Ernen in 1987, which is to this day carrying his legacy with growing numbers of concertgoers. The city's officials made him an honorary citizen—only their third in 800 years.

Quotes 
Prior to a 1985 recital at IU's Musical Arts Center, Sebők looked back on his concert at age 14, and drew a connection between that event and his teaching philosophy. "During the third movement I made some mistakes," he recalled, "but I didn't feel guilty about it because I felt I had done my best. We had a neighbor, a music lover, who said to my grandfather about my performance, 'Oh, that was wonderful, but in the third movement something went wrong.' My grandfather became very angry with him and said, 'I don't care, because the sun has spots, too.' That was a beautiful thing for my grandfather to say, I think, and sometimes I remember that: Even the sun has spots."

Similarly, Sebők helped his students overcome fear of mistakes in order to give their best performances.

References

Primary sources 
 In memoriam : György Sebők 
 György Sebők - Artisttrove
 György Sebők - Allmusic
 Tracing Liabraaten's Musical Roots to Liszt & Beethoven

External links 

 Biography of György Sebök - Founder of the Musikdorf Ernen Festival
 Sebok: in memoriam - Indiana University.
  his feelings during and after the war and plays the Busoni transcription of the Bach's Adagio - BWV 564.
 
 In memoriam: Gyorgy Sebok Musical Times, Spring 2000.

Hungarian classical pianists
Male classical pianists
1922 births
1999 deaths
Hungarian music educators
Jacobs School of Music faculty
20th-century classical pianists
20th-century Hungarian male musicians
Hungarian emigrants to the United States